North Caddo High School is a public high school in Vivian, Louisiana. The school is a part of Caddo Public Schools.

History
Established in 1955, North Caddo High School is home to the Titans. The official school colors are red and black.

Athletics
North Caddo High athletics competes in the LHSAA.

Notable alumni
Danny McCormick, politician
Jeremy Moore, professional baseball player
Phil Robertson, television personality
Si Robertson, television personality
Robert Williams III (2016), professional basketball player

See also
List of high schools in Louisiana

References

External links
Official website

Educational institutions established in 1955
1955 establishments in Louisiana
Schools in Caddo Parish, Louisiana
Public high schools in Louisiana